Protein tyrosine phosphatase-like protein PTPLAD1 is an enzyme that in humans is encoded by the PTPLAD1 gene.

References

Further reading